The 1995–96 season was the 61st season in the existence of RCD Espanyol and the club's second consecutive season in the top flight of Spanish football. In addition to the domestic league, Espanyol participated in this season's edition of the Copa del Rey.

Players

First-team squad

Competitions

Overall record

La Liga

League table

Results summary

Results by round

Matches

Source:

Copa del Rey

Second round

Third round

Round of 16

Quarter-finals

Semi-finals

Statistics

Goalscorers

References

RCD Espanyol seasons
RCD Espanyol